The Western shovelnose snake (Sonora occipitalis) is a species of snake of the family Colubridae.

Geographic range
The snake is found in the United States (Arizona, California, Nevada) and Mexico.

References 

Reptiles described in 1854
Reptiles of the United States
Reptiles of Mexico
Snakes of Central America
Fauna of the Southwestern United States
Sonora (snake)